Manjari is a village 4 km from Hadapsar, India, which is a suburban area around Pune. Manjari railway station is one of the Pune Suburban Railway located on Pune - Daund section. Mr Shivraj Ghule is First person(sarpanch=सरपंच) of Manjari Village.

Its named after "Manjarai Devi", a traditional Hindu deity. It has Special Economic Zone and Serum Institute of India is located in Manjari, it is well-known for developing Covishield vaccine for COVID-19. Manjari is an industrial hotspot and it is close to Keshav Nagar/Hafapsar/,Phursungi.

Cities and towns in Pune district